Federico Martín Elduayén Saldaña (born June 25, 1977) is an Uruguayan football former goalkeeper. His nickname is "Vikingo" (Viking).

Career

Club career
He began his career in the youth squads of Peñarol.  He made his professional debut in 1999, in the Copa Mercosur defending Peñarol against Vasco Da Gama in Brazil. Elduayén participated in six straight Copa Libertadores editions with Peñarol from 2000–2005. 

He was the team's starting goalkeeper until 2005 when he lost his job and moved to Universidad de Concepción in Chile. Ever since joining the Chilean side he became the starting goalkeeper there. He renewed his contract until the end of the 2009 season. The following year Elduayén transferred to O'Higgins where he played for one season, before signing with Unión Española. In 2012, he landed in Bolivia and signing for Universitario de Sucre.

International career
Elduayen made one appearance for the Uruguay national football team and was part of the squad for the 2002 FIFA World Cup.

Titles

References

External links

1977 births
Living people
People from Fray Bentos
Uruguayan footballers
Uruguayan expatriate footballers
Uruguay international footballers
Peñarol players
Unión Española footballers
Universidad de Concepción footballers
O'Higgins F.C. footballers
Universitario de Sucre footballers
Guabirá players
Uruguayan Primera División players
Bolivian Primera División players
Chilean Primera División players
Association football goalkeepers
2002 FIFA World Cup players
Uruguayan expatriate sportspeople in Chile
Uruguayan expatriate sportspeople in Bolivia
Expatriate footballers in Chile
Expatriate footballers in Bolivia